The zygomaticotemporal suture (or temporozygomatic suture) is the cranial suture between the zygomatic bone and the temporal bone. This is part of the zygomatic arch. Movement at the suture decreases with development during aging. It has a complex internal structure.

Additional images

See also
 Zygomatic arch

References

External links

 

Bones of the head and neck
Cranial sutures
Human head and neck
Joints
Joints of the head and neck
Skeletal system
Skull